(English: Hanako-san of the Toilet), also known as School Mystery or Phantom of the Toilet, is a 1995 Japanese horror film directed by Jōji Matsuoka. Based on the Japanese urban legend of Hanako-san, the spirit of a young girl who haunts school bathrooms, the film stars Takayuki Inoue, Ai Maeda, Yuka Kōno, Etsushi Toyokawa, and Nene Ohtsuka.

Plot
On her first day at a new school, a young transfer student named Saeko Mizuno is seen leaving the last stall in the girls' bathroom. Students at the school believe that a young girl named Hanako-san committed suicide in that stall, and that her spirit remains there. Since the students who believe in the Hanako-san legend avoid using that stall, rumors begin to spread that Mizuno is actually Hanako-san herself. Many of the students also believe that Hanako-san is responsible for a series of child homicides which have been occurring in the area around the school, and so they assume that Mizuno has come to their school in search of victims. The real murderer decapitates the school goat one day, which raises further suspicions against Mizuno, since she was the one appointed to feed the animal that day.

Wanting to see if Mizuno truly is Hanako-san, Mizuno's classmates decide to lock her in the last stall in the girls' bathroom over night, surmising that, if she is still there in the morning, she must not be Hanako-san. Unbeknownst to Mizuno's classmates, the child killer is lurking around the school, and he eventually confronts Mizuno and one of her friends. The real Hanako-san appears, and is revealed to be a benevolent spirit. She summons a mob of students to the school, and they surround the killer, preventing him from escaping until the police and other adults arrive.

Cast
 Takayuki Inoue as Takuya Sakamoto
 Ai Maeda as Natsumi Sakamoto
 Yuka Kōno as Saeko Mizuno
 Etsushi Toyokawa as Yuji Sakamoto
 Nene Ohtsuka as Yuriko Suzuki
 Chiaki Kuriyama as Little Child

Critical reception
In his book Flowers from Hell: The Modern Japanese Horror Film, author Jim Harper writes: "Although it's difficult to imagine American or European parents allowing their offspring to watch a film in which young children are terrorized by a serial killer, Toire no Hanako-san is easily the best of the Japanese horror movies aimed at pre-teen audiences."

References

Sources

External links
 
 

1995 films
Films directed by Joji Matsuoka
Japanese ghost films
Japanese horror films
Japanese supernatural horror films
1995 horror films
1990s Japanese films